Olav Lid (1908–1998) was a Norwegian jurist.

He was born in Kviteseid. He was a programme secretary and chief secretary in the Norwegian Broadcasting Corporation between 1945 and 1957. In 1961 he took the dr.juris degree with the thesis Tomtefeste, and was appointed professor of jurisprudence at the Norwegian College of Agriculture in the same year. He retired in 1978. Lid also chaired the board of the Norwegian National Opera from its inception in 1957 to 1969.

References

1908 births
1998 deaths
People from Kviteseid
NRK people
Norwegian legal scholars
Academic staff of the Norwegian College of Agriculture